(Northern Barmbek) is a quarter of Hamburg, Germany, in the borough of Hamburg-Nord. It is located in the east of Hamburg-Nord, approximately five kilometers from Hamburg city center. Barmbek-Nord is a densely built-up area.

Barmbek-Nord borders the quarters of Ohlsdorf, Steilshoop, Bramfeld, Wandsbek, Dulsberg, Barmbek-Süd and Winterhude.

History 

Barmbek-Nord was farmland until the end of the 19th century. A workers' district, its population mainly grew in size during industrialization in the 1910s and 1920s, although it did also have industrial structures itself. In 1907, the Hamburg-Altonaer Stadt- und Vorortbahn (Hamburg - Altona urban and suburban railway, now incorporated into Hamburg S-Bahn) with the Barmbeck station, now Barmbek station started operation. In Barmbek-Nord the stations of Rübenkamp (1913), later Alte Wöhr (1931) opened. In 1912, the Hamburger Hochbahn started operating the first part of the Hamburg U-Bahn circle line from Barmbek station via Mundsburg to central station. In 1930 the track to the station of Habichtstraße opened.

In 1913 the hospital of Barmbek, (Allgemeines Krankenhaus Barmbek, today Asklepios Klinik Barmbek), was also established. Until the incorporation of neighboring villages Bramfeld and Steilshoop 1937 by the Greater Hamburg Act the present-day quarters of Barmbek-Nord and Dulsberg, which were then still named Barmbeck along with Barmbek-Süd, formed a part of the Hamburger eastern border with Prussia. In 1937, Barmbek-Nord became a part of Hamburg, and has remained that way since. Barmbek-Nord faced major destruction during the Bombing of Hamburg in World War II. In the 1970s and 1980s the quarter underwent economic structural change, parts of the population moving away. Meanwhile it turned from a workers quarter into a more family-friendly environment. To date it is a vivid quarter, especially around Barmbek station and the major shopping street of Fuhlsbüttler Straße.

Politics
These are the results of Barmbek-Nord in the Hamburg state election:

References

External links

 Barmbek-Nord, Hamburg.de

Quarters of Hamburg
Hamburg-Nord